Tinejdad is a city in Errachidia Province, Drâa-Tafilalet, Morocco. According to the 2014 census it has a population of 43999 .

References

External links

Populated places in Errachidia Province